Thollon-les-Mémises is a commune in the Haute-Savoie department in the Auvergne-Rhône-Alpes region in south-eastern France.

It has its own ski resort with direct access to 50 km of downhill skiing, with 14 individual pistes, served by 18 ski lifts.

See also
Communes of the Haute-Savoie department

References

Communes of Haute-Savoie